Alona smirnovi is a species of crustacean in family Chydoridae. It is endemic to North Macedonia. Its natural habitat is inland karsts.

References

Cladocera
Freshwater crustaceans of Europe
Endemic arthropods of North Macedonia
Taxonomy articles created by Polbot
Crustaceans described in 1972